Eugnosta dives is a species of moth of the  family Tortricidae. It is found in China (Heilongjiang, Inner Mongolia, Jiangsu, Jilin, Liaoning, Ningxia, Shaanxi, Shandong), Japan and Russia.

Adults are shining white, the forewings thinly and minutely black-speckled, pale luteous along most of the costa, and with an irregular pale luteous discal stripe. The hindwings are brown, with an aeneous tinge.

References

Moths described in 1878
Eugnosta